Martina Fischer (born 29 September 1970 in Bad Nauheim) is a German professional golfer. She has competed, and won tournaments, on both the Ladies European Tour and LPGA Tour.

Amateur wins
1994 European Ladies Amateur Championship

Professional wins (3)

LPGA Tour wins (1)

Ladies European Tour wins (2)
1996 McDonald's WPGA Championship of Europe
2000 Dutch Ladies Open

Team appearances
Amateur
Espirito Santo Trophy (representing Germany): 1988, 1990, 1994
European Ladies' Team Championship (representing Germany): 1993
Sources:

References

External links

German female golfers
Ladies European Tour golfers
LPGA Tour golfers
People from Bad Nauheim
Sportspeople from Darmstadt (region)
1970 births
Living people